Lampronia taylorella is a moth of the family Prodoxidae. In North America it is found along the coast of British Columbia and in Washington and Montana.

The wingspan is about 18 mm.

References

Moths described in 1907
Prodoxidae
Moths of North America